Balnacoil is a small crofting village, lying in the strath of Brora, one mile west of Loch Brora, in the east county of Sutherland, in Highland, Scotland. The River Brora, which rises in Ben Armine, runs through Balnacoil, draining into the loch.

Balnacoil is in the Scottish council area of Highland.

References

Populated places in Sutherland